Martin Higgins (born 1879) was an English professional footballer who played as a wing half.

References

1879 births
Sportspeople from Consett
Footballers from County Durham
English footballers
Association football wing halves
Bishop Auckland F.C. players
Grimsby Town F.C. players
Bristol Rovers F.C. players
Gillingham F.C. players
Scunthorpe United F.C. players
English Football League players
Year of death missing